The Vologda constituency (No.85) is a Russian legislative constituency in Vologda Oblast. The constituency covers central and eastern Vologda Oblast, including its capital — Vologda.

Members elected

Election results

1993

|-
! colspan=2 style="background-color:#E9E9E9;text-align:left;vertical-align:top;" |Candidate
! style="background-color:#E9E9E9;text-align:left;vertical-align:top;" |Party
! style="background-color:#E9E9E9;text-align:right;" |Votes
! style="background-color:#E9E9E9;text-align:right;" |%
|-
|style="background-color:"|
|align=left|Tamara Leta
|align=left|Agrarian Party
|
|25.08%
|-
|style="background-color:"|
|align=left|Sergey Churkin
|align=left|Liberal Democratic Party
| -
|13.40%
|-
| colspan="5" style="background-color:#E9E9E9;"|
|- style="font-weight:bold"
| colspan="3" style="text-align:left;" | Total
| 
| 100%
|-
| colspan="5" style="background-color:#E9E9E9;"|
|- style="font-weight:bold"
| colspan="4" |Source:
|
|}

1995

|-
! colspan=2 style="background-color:#E9E9E9;text-align:left;vertical-align:top;" |Candidate
! style="background-color:#E9E9E9;text-align:left;vertical-align:top;" |Party
! style="background-color:#E9E9E9;text-align:right;" |Votes
! style="background-color:#E9E9E9;text-align:right;" |%
|-
|style="background-color:"|
|align=left|Vladimir Lopatin
|align=left|Independent
|
|18.77%
|-
|style="background-color:"|
|align=left|Mikhail Surov
|align=left|Party of Tax Cuts' Supporters
|
|12.26%
|-
|style="background-color:"|
|align=left|Tamara Leta (incumbent)
|align=left|Agrarian Party
|
|11.60%
|-
|style="background-color:#D50000"|
|align=left|Nikolay Vodomerov
|align=left|Communists and Working Russia - for the Soviet Union
|
|10.25%
|-
|style="background-color:"|
|align=left|Sergey Churkin
|align=left|Liberal Democratic Party
|
|8.40%
|-
|style="background-color:"|
|align=left|Leonid Shonurov
|align=left|Independent
|
|6.74%
|-
|style="background-color:"|
|align=left|Yury Sivkov
|align=left|Our Home – Russia
|
|5.56%
|-
|style="background-color:#3A46CE"|
|align=left|Vladimir Smirnov
|align=left|Democratic Choice of Russia – United Democrats
|
|4.83%
|-
|style="background-color:"|
|align=left|Lyudmila Kotesova
|align=left|Independent
|
|4.83%
|-
|style="background-color:#DD137B"|
|align=left|Aleksandr Lukichev
|align=left|Social Democrats
|
|2.28%
|-
|style="background-color:"|
|align=left|Nikolay Klyuyev
|align=left|Independent
|
|1.96%
|-
|style="background-color:#192082"|
|align=left|Konstantin Shishin
|align=left|Frontier Generation
|
|1.02%
|-
|style="background-color:#3C3E42"|
|align=left|Mikhail Gusev
|align=left|Duma-96
|
|0.61%
|-
|style="background-color:"|
|align=left|Vladimir Rachek
|align=left|Independent
|
|0.52%
|-
|style="background-color:#000000"|
|colspan=2 |against all
|
|8.38%
|-
| colspan="5" style="background-color:#E9E9E9;"|
|- style="font-weight:bold"
| colspan="3" style="text-align:left;" | Total
| 
| 100%
|-
| colspan="5" style="background-color:#E9E9E9;"|
|- style="font-weight:bold"
| colspan="4" |Source:
|
|}

1999

|-
! colspan=2 style="background-color:#E9E9E9;text-align:left;vertical-align:top;" |Candidate
! style="background-color:#E9E9E9;text-align:left;vertical-align:top;" |Party
! style="background-color:#E9E9E9;text-align:right;" |Votes
! style="background-color:#E9E9E9;text-align:right;" |%
|-
|style="background-color:"|
|align=left|Valentin Chayka
|align=left|Independent
|
|30.10%
|-
|style="background-color:#3B9EDF"|
|align=left|Aleksandr Leshukov
|align=left|Fatherland – All Russia
|
|22.10%
|-
|style="background-color:#1042A5"|
|align=left|Lyudmila Kotesova
|align=left|Union of Right Forces
|
|9.93%
|-
|style="background:"| 
|align=left|Vladimir Shepel
|align=left|Yabloko
|
|5.93%
|-
|style="background-color:"|
|align=left|Viktor Akulov
|align=left|Liberal Democratic Party
|
|3.31%
|-
|style="background-color:#FF4400"|
|align=left|Nina Belyayeva
|align=left|Andrey Nikolayev and Svyatoslav Fyodorov Bloc
|
|3.21%
|-
|style="background-color:#FCCA19"|
|align=left|Vyacheslav Goglev
|align=left|Congress of Russian Communities-Yury Boldyrev Movement
|
|1.63%
|-
|style="background-color:"|
|align=left|Vladimir Kirillov
|align=left|Independent
|
|1.42%
|-
|style="background-color:#020266"|
|align=left|Aleksandr Voronin
|align=left|Russian Socialist Party
|
|1.29%
|-
|style="background-color:"|
|align=left|Viktor Nikulshin
|align=left|Independent
|
|0.98%
|-
|style="background-color:#084284"|
|align=left|Bronislav Omelichev
|align=left|Spiritual Heritage
|
|0.79%
|-
|style="background-color:#000000"|
|colspan=2 |against all
|
|16.16%
|-
| colspan="5" style="background-color:#E9E9E9;"|
|- style="font-weight:bold"
| colspan="3" style="text-align:left;" | Total
| 
| 100%
|-
| colspan="5" style="background-color:#E9E9E9;"|
|- style="font-weight:bold"
| colspan="4" |Source:
|
|}

2003

|-
! colspan=2 style="background-color:#E9E9E9;text-align:left;vertical-align:top;" |Candidate
! style="background-color:#E9E9E9;text-align:left;vertical-align:top;" |Party
! style="background-color:#E9E9E9;text-align:right;" |Votes
! style="background-color:#E9E9E9;text-align:right;" |%
|-
|style="background-color:#FFD700"|
|align=left|Valentin Chayka (incumbent)
|align=left|People's Party
|
|50.52%
|-
|style="background-color:"|
|align=left|Mikhail Surov
|align=left|Independent
|
|16.82%
|-
|style="background-color:"|
|align=left|Vladimir Bulanov
|align=left|Agrarian Party
|
|12.66%
|-
|style="background-color:#00A1FF"|
|align=left|Viktor Anufriyev
|align=left|Party of Russia's Rebirth-Russian Party of Life
|
|3.99%
|-
|style="background-color:#164C8C"|
|align=left|Viktor Nefedov
|align=left|United Russian Party Rus'
|
|0.82%
|-
|style="background-color:#000000"|
|colspan=2 |against all
|
|13.40%
|-
| colspan="5" style="background-color:#E9E9E9;"|
|- style="font-weight:bold"
| colspan="3" style="text-align:left;" | Total
| 
| 100%
|-
| colspan="5" style="background-color:#E9E9E9;"|
|- style="font-weight:bold"
| colspan="4" |Source:
|
|}

2016

|-
! colspan=2 style="background-color:#E9E9E9;text-align:left;vertical-align:top;" |Candidate
! style="background-color:#E9E9E9;text-align:leftt;vertical-align:top;" |Party
! style="background-color:#E9E9E9;text-align:right;" |Votes
! style="background-color:#E9E9E9;text-align:right;" |%
|-
| style="background-color: " |
|align=left|Yevgeny Shulepov
|align=left|United Russia
|
|32.33%
|-
|style="background-color:"|
|align=left|Anton Grimov
|align=left|Liberal Democratic Party
|
|16.54%
|-
|style="background-color:"|
|align=left|Aleksandr Teltevskoy
|align=left|A Just Russia
|
|14.07%
|-
|style="background-color:"|
|align=left|Mikhail Selin
|align=left|Communist Party
|
|12.65%
|-
|style="background:"| 
|align=left|Yevgeny Domozhirov
|align=left|People's Freedom Party
|
|5.76%
|-
|style="background:"| 
|align=left|Kirill Panko
|align=left|Communists of Russia
|
|5.08%
|-
|style="background-color:"|
|align=left|Olga Milyukova
|align=left|The Greens
|
|3.79%
|-
|style="background-color:"|
|align=left|Aleksey Nekrasov
|align=left|Yabloko
|
|3.28%
|-
|style="background-color:"|
|align=left|Aleksey Mikhaylov
|align=left|Party of Growth
|
|2.42%
|-
| colspan="5" style="background-color:#E9E9E9;"|
|- style="font-weight:bold"
| colspan="3" style="text-align:left;" | Total
| 
| 100%
|-
| colspan="5" style="background-color:#E9E9E9;"|
|- style="font-weight:bold"
| colspan="4" |Source:
|
|}

2021

|-
! colspan=2 style="background-color:#E9E9E9;text-align:left;vertical-align:top;" |Candidate
! style="background-color:#E9E9E9;text-align:left;vertical-align:top;" |Party
! style="background-color:#E9E9E9;text-align:right;" |Votes
! style="background-color:#E9E9E9;text-align:right;" |%
|-
|style="background-color: " |
|align=left|Valentina Artamonova
|align=left|United Russia
|
|34.81%
|-
|style="background-color:"|
|align=left|Oleg Yershov
|align=left|Communist Party
|
|22.46%
|-
|style="background-color:"|
|align=left|Viktor Leukhin
|align=left|A Just Russia — For Truth
|
|10.32%
|-
|style="background-color:"|
|align=left|Anton Grimov
|align=left|Liberal Democratic Party
|
|9.57%
|-
|style="background-color: "|
|align=left|Aleksandr Bolotov
|align=left|Party of Pensioners
|
|7.74%
|-
|style="background-color: "|
|align=left|Andrey Pautov
|align=left|New People
|
|5.84%
|-
|style="background-color:"|
|align=left|Olga Domozhirova
|align=left|Yabloko
|
|3.55%
|-
|style="background-color:"|
|align=left|Ilya Anferyev
|align=left|Rodina
|
|1.99%
|-
| colspan="5" style="background-color:#E9E9E9;"|
|- style="font-weight:bold"
| colspan="3" style="text-align:left;" | Total
| 
| 100%
|-
| colspan="5" style="background-color:#E9E9E9;"|
|- style="font-weight:bold"
| colspan="4" |Source:
|
|}

Notes

References

Russian legislative constituencies
Politics of Vologda Oblast